Szentjakabfa is a village in Veszprém county, Hungary.

External links 
 Street map (Hungarian)
 Aerial photographs of Szentjakabfa

Populated places in Veszprém County